The Cello Concerto in A minor, Op. 129, by Robert Schumann was completed in a period of only two weeks, between 10 October and 24 October 1850, shortly after Schumann became the music director at Düsseldorf.

The concerto was never played in Schumann's lifetime. It was premiered on 23 April 1860, four years after his death, in Oldenburg, with Ludwig Ebert as soloist.

The length of a typical performance is about 25 minutes.

Instrumentation 
The work is scored for solo cello, two flutes, two oboes, two clarinets, two bassoons, two horns, two trumpets, timpani, and strings.

Structure 
Written late in his short life, the concerto is considered one of Schumann's more enigmatic works due to its structure, the length of the exposition, and the transcendental quality of the opening as well as the intense lyricism of the second movement. On the autograph score, Schumann gave the title Konzertstück (concert piece) rather than Konzert (concerto), which suggested he intended to depart from the traditional conventions of a concerto from the very beginning. It is notable that Schumann's earlier piano concerto in the same key was also originally written as a concert piece.

Consistent with many of Schumann's other works, the concerto utilizes both fully realized and fragmentary thematic material introduced in the first movement, material which is then quoted and developed throughout.  Together with the concerto's relatively short, linked movements, the concerto is thus extremely unified both in material and in character, although the work's emotional scope is very wide.  Schumann's use of the same themes but in very different contexts and moods lends the cello concerto a strong sense of character development and an extended emotional arc, from its opening measures vacillating between deeply meditative and agitated to the brilliant, affirmative conclusion.

The piece is in three movements:

Schumann famously abhorred applause between movements. As a result, there are no breaks between any of the movements in the concerto; indeed, Schumann's skill in handling the two transitions between the three movements are among the concerto's most striking features.   As for the concerto's virtuosity, Schumann earlier in his life declared "I cannot write a concerto for the virtuosos. I must try for something else".  In the cello concerto, while exploiting the instrument to the fullest, the writing for the soloist generally avoids virtuosic display prominent in many concertos of the time.

Reception 
Although the cello concerto is now performed with some regularity, the work spent many decades in obscurity, virtually unknown.  Schumann was unable to secure a premiere of the work and initial reactions to his score were mostly very negative.  This may have been in part due to the work's unusual structure as well as the personal, inward nature of the music and the lack of passages written to display the technical skill of the cello soloist;  however, it may also be argued that it is these very qualities as well as Schumann's conception of the concerto that make the work so singular and admirable.  As is often the case with the music of Schumann, the concerto, while offering more than ample technical demands, also requires an interpreter of the highest order and while criticism of the work persists, some cellists place the Schumann concerto alongside the cello concertos of Dvořák and Elgar in a group of three great Romantic works for their instrument.

Arrangements
Schumann created a version for violin and orchestra for Joseph Joachim to play.

References

External links 

Compositions by Robert Schumann
Schumann Cello Concerto
1850 compositions
Compositions in A minor
Schumann